League of Una-Sana Canton is a fourth level league in the Bosnia and Herzegovina football league system. The league champion is promoted to the Second League of the Federation of Bosnia and Herzegovina - West.

Member clubs
List of clubs competing in 2020–21 season: 

 NK Bajer 99
 NK Borac Izačić
 NK Bratstvo Bosanska Krupa
 NK Ključ
 NK Mladost Vrnograč
 NK Omladinac 75
 NK Omladinac Sanica
 NK Željezničar Bosanska Krupa

References

4
Bos